It's Great to Be Alive (1933) is an American Pre-Code science fiction musical comedy film produced by Fox Film Corporation, is a remake of The Last Man on Earth (1924), and later influenced the novel Mr. Adam (1946) by Pat Frank.

Plot
A young aviator, Carlos Martin (played by Raul Roulien), is dumped by his girlfriend (Gloria Stuart), and heads on a solo flight across the Pacific Ocean. He has engine trouble and makes an emergency landing on an uninhabited island out in the Pacific. Shortly afterward, a pandemic of a new disease called "masculitis" kills every fertile male human on the planet. When efforts to cure the disease fail, the human race is doomed. Humanity's institutions are all run by women, including the Chicago underworld. Carlos escapes the island, and once he returns home and hears the news, it now depends on him to continue the human race.

Cast

Production
The film was shot during April 1933, with location scenes photographed at the Grand Central Airport in Glendale, California.

Other cast members include Edna May Oliver, Joan Marsh, Edward Van Sloan, and Peaches Jackson.

A sequence depicts look-a-likes of the two top scientists of the era, Albert Einstein and Auguste Piccard, trying to find a cure for masculitis. Another scene portrays a burlesque show dubbed "Girls of all Nations".

References

External links
 
 
 

1933 films
1933 musical comedy films
1930s science fiction comedy films
Fox Film films
American science fiction comedy films
Remakes of American films
American musical comedy films
American black-and-white films
Films about aviators
Science fiction musical films
Films directed by Alfred L. Werker
Films set in the Pacific Ocean
Films set on uninhabited islands
Films shot in California
American post-apocalyptic films
Sound film remakes of silent films
Films about viral outbreaks
1930s English-language films
1930s American films